Landwer Coffee is the first coffee roaster company opened in Israel and the second largest in the country. It was originally established in 1919 in Germany.

History 
Landwer Coffee was established by Moshe Landwer in 1919 in Berlin, Germany. The family operated a small coffee bar and a coffee roasting facility. In 1933, when the Nazis came to power in Germany, the family decided to immigrate to Tel Aviv. Immediately after their arrival, the Landwer family opened their first coffee roasting facility in Allenby Street, making it the first coffee roaster company in the country. Later, when the business expanded, the family moved the coffee bar to 121 Allenby Street.

In 1964, the roasting facility was moved to the industrial area in Holon, Israel, in a hangar of 1000 square meters. In the early 1980s, the Federman family acquired Landwer Coffee from Shmuel Landwer, the son of Moshe Landwer. Today, under the ownership of Federman & Sons (Holdings) Ltd., Landwer Coffee produces and distributes Turkish and Espresso coffee. It is the second largest coffee roaster in Israel.

Landwer Café 
In 2004, the company developed the Landwer Café chain of franchise casual restaurants, which grew by 2018 to 60 locations in Israel. It opened its first North American locations in 2017 (in Toronto) and 2018 (the Audubon Circle area of Boston, Massachusetts).

As of 2022, there are six locations in Canada (five in Toronto and one in Maple, Ontario), and four in the United States (three in Massachusetts and one in California). 

While the US franchise's website mentions the organization's growth in Israel subsequent to Moshe Landwer's aliyah, the Canadian website makes no mention of Israel, emphasizing the original café's origins in Berlin and describing the menu as "inspired by Mediterranean and Italian cuisine."

References

External links 
Landwer Coffee website 
Federman & Sons website
Landwer Café – Israel
Café Landwer – USA
Café Landwer – Canada

Food and drink companies of Israel
Israeli brands